Matej Mohorič (born 19 October 1994) is a Slovenian professional road racing cyclist who currently rides for UCI WorldTeam . Mohorič turned professional in 2014. He is the Slovenian road race champion for 2018 and 2021.

Biography

Born on 19 October 1994, in Kranj, Slovenia, Mohorič currently resides in Podblica, Slovenia.

Mohorič won the 2012 UCI World Junior Road Race Championships and the 2013 UCI World Under-23 Road Race Championships, becoming the first rider to win world junior and under-23 titles in consecutive years.

He was named in the start list for the 2015 Vuelta a España, but he withdrew on the 6th stage. Subsequently, it was announced that he would join  from 2016 on a two-year contract. He was named in the start list for the 2016 Giro d'Italia. Mohorič secured his first Grand Tour stage win when he soloed to victory in Stage 7 of the 2017 Vuelta a España. In Stage 10 of the 2018 Giro d'Italia he took his second win in a Grand Tour, winning a two-man sprint against Nico Denz.

In July 2019, he was named in the startlist for the 2019 Tour de France.

He participated in the 2020 Tour de France and the 2021 Tour de France, garnering two stage wins in the 2021 Tour after crashing out of the Giro two months before. His second victory came the day after a police raid on the Bahrain Victorious hotel stemming from allegations of doping; Mohorič celebrated his win by 'zipping' his lips, adding in a post-race interview, "At the end of the day I’ve got nothing to hide. I don’t care too much."

In 2022, Mohorič won the Milan-San Remo monument, attacking on the descent of the Poggio using a dropper seatpost.

He defeated Jonas Vingegaard to win the 2022 CRO Race.

Major results

2011
 7th Overall Regio-Tour
2012
 UCI Junior Road World Championships
1st  Road race
2nd  Time trial
 1st  Overall Giro di Basilicata
1st  Points classification
1st  Mountains classification
1st Stages 1, 2, 3 (ITT), & 4
 1st  Overall Giro della Lunigiana
 1st  Overall Junioren Radrundfahrt Oberösterreich
 UEC European Road Championships
3rd  Time trial
4th Road race
2013
 1st  Road race, UCI Road World Under–23 Championships
 National Road Championships
4th Road race
4th Time trial
 7th Piccolo Giro di Lombardia
2014
 5th Road race, National Road Championships
2015
 5th Road race, National Road Championships
 6th Japan Cup
2016
 2nd Time trial, National Road Championships
 3rd Overall Tour of Hainan
1st Stage 6
2017
 1st Stage 7 Vuelta a España
 1st Hong Kong Challenge
 3rd Road race, National Road Championships
 6th Overall Tour of Guangxi
 8th Trofeo Laigueglia
2018
 1st  Road race, National Road Championships
 1st  Overall BinckBank Tour
 1st  Overall Deutschland Tour
1st  Points classification
1st  Young rider classification
1st Stage 3
 1st GP Industria & Artigianato di Larciano
 1st Stage 10 Giro d'Italia
 1st Stage 1 Tour of Austria
 3rd Overall Tour of Slovenia
 7th Giro della Toscana
2019
 1st Stage 7 Tour de Pologne
 National Road Championships
2nd Time trial
5th Road race
 3rd Gran Premio di Lugano
 5th Milan–San Remo
 9th Gent–Wevelgem
2020
 3rd Road race, National Road Championships
 4th Liège–Bastogne–Liège
 10th Milan–San Remo
2021
 1st  Road race, National Road Championships
 Tour de France
1st Stages 7 & 19
Held  after Stage 7
 Combativity award Stages 7 & 19
 2nd Overall Benelux Tour
1st Stage 7 
 2nd Overall Tour de Pologne
 2nd Clásica de San Sebastián
 7th Overall Tour of Slovenia
1st  Points classification
 8th Amstel Gold Race
 10th Liège–Bastogne–Liège
2022
 1st  Overall CRO Race
 1st Milan–San Remo
 2nd Time trial, National Road Championships
 2nd Gran Piemonte
 4th E3 Saxo Bank Classic
 5th Paris–Roubaix
 9th Gent–Wevelgem
2023
 3rd Kuurne–Brussels–Kuurne
 6th Strade Bianche
 8th Milan–San Remo

Grand Tour general classification results timeline

Classics results timeline

References

External links

Cycling Base: Matej Mohorič
Cycling Quotient: Matej Mohorič
Cannondale-Garmin: Matej Mohorič

1994 births
Living people
Slovenian male cyclists
Slovenian Tour de France stage winners
Slovenian Vuelta a España stage winners
Slovenian Giro d'Italia stage winners
Sportspeople from Kranj
Cyclists at the 2016 Summer Olympics
Olympic cyclists of Slovenia